Dr. Ing. Wilhelm "Wim" Reni Brandt was a German military officer and engineer known for his writings and developments in the fields of camouflage and tank warfare, being friends with Ernst Volckmann. Among other developments, Brandt was responsible for a type of camouflage clothing and helmet covers issued to the Waffen SS. Brandt also wrote a number of works on armored warfare theory, beginning in 1924. In the early 1930s, Brandt participated in the Chaco War between Bolivia and Paraguay, assisting the Bolivian side and their small armoured forces.

He was severly wounded on the Eastern Front on 13 July 1941 and died two days later in a military field hospital.

Commands
 Company Commander in the SS-Standarte 'Deutschland'
 Leader of the SS-Panzer-Abwehr-Sturmbann der SS-VT
 Commander of the SS-Kradschützen-Sturmbann 'Verfügungstruppe'
 Commander of the SS-Aufklärungs-Abteilung 'Verfügungstruppe'
 Commander of the SS-Totenkopf-Standarte 11 of the SS-Division 'Deutschland'.
 Commander of the SS-Regiment 11 of the SS-Division (mot.)'Reich'.

SS-Promotions
 1 March 1936: SS-Hauptsturmführer
 1 June 1939: SS-Sturmbannführer
 1 July 1940: SS-Obersturmbannführer

References

Tank tactics
1900 births
1941 deaths
Engineers from Wesel
Military personnel from North Rhine-Westphalia
SS-Obersturmbannführer
Recipients of the Iron Cross (1914), 2nd class
Bolivian military personnel
Foreign military officers of the Chaco War
People of the Chaco War
German military engineers
Waffen-SS personnel killed in action